The stamen (plural stamina or stamens) is the pollen-producing reproductive organ of a flower. Collectively the stamens form the androecium.

Morphology and terminology

A stamen typically consists of a stalk called the filament and an anther which contains microsporangia. Most commonly anthers are two-lobed and are attached to the filament either at the base or in the middle area of the anther. The sterile tissue between the lobes is called the connective, an extension of the filament containing conducting strands. It can be seen as an extension on the dorsal side of the anther. A pollen grain develops from a microspore in the microsporangium and contains the male gametophyte.

The stamens in a flower are collectively called the androecium. The androecium can consist of as few as one-half stamen (i.e. a single locule) as in Canna species or as many as 3,482 stamens which have been counted in the saguaro (Carnegiea gigantea). The androecium in various species of plants forms a great variety of patterns, some of them highly complex. It generally surrounds the gynoecium and is surrounded by the perianth. A few members of the family Triuridaceae, particularly Lacandonia schismatica and Lacandonia braziliana, along with a few species of  Trithuria (family Hydatellaceae) are  exceptional in that their gynoecia surround their androecia.

Etymology
 Stamen is the Latin word meaning "thread" (originally thread of the warp, in weaving).
 Filament derives from classical Latin filum, meaning "thread"
 Anther derives from French anthère, from classical Latin anthera, meaning "medicine extracted from the flower"  in turn from Ancient Greek ἀνθηρά, feminine of ἀνθηρός meaning "flowery", from ἄνθος meaning "flower"
 Androecium (plural androecia) derives from Ancient Greek ἀνήρ meaning "man", and οἶκος meaning "house" or "chamber/room".

Variation in morphology

Depending on the species of plant, some or all of the stamens in a flower may be attached to the petals or to the floral axis. They also may be free-standing or fused to one another in many different ways, including fusion of some but not all stamens. The filaments may be fused and the anthers free, or the filaments free and the anthers fused. Rather than there being two locules, one locule of a stamen may fail to develop, or alternatively the two locules may merge late in development to give a single locule. Extreme cases of stamen fusion occur in some species of Cyclanthera in the family Cucurbitaceae and in section Cyclanthera of genus Phyllanthus (family Euphorbiaceae) where the stamens form a ring around the gynoecium, with a single locule. Plants having a single stamen are referred to as "monandrous."

Pollen production
A typical anther contains four microsporangia. The microsporangia form sacs or pockets (locules) in the anther (anther sacs or pollen sacs). The two separate locules on each side of an anther may fuse into a single locule. Each microsporangium is lined with a nutritive tissue layer called the tapetum and initially contains diploid pollen mother cells. These undergo meiosis to form haploid spores. The spores may remain attached to each other in a tetrad or separate after meiosis. Each microspore then divides mitotically to form an immature microgametophyte called a pollen grain.

The pollen is eventually released when the anther forms openings (dehisces). These may consist of longitudinal slits, pores, as in the heath family (Ericaceae), or by valves, as in the barberry family (Berberidaceae). In some plants, notably members of Orchidaceae and Asclepiadoideae, the pollen remains in masses called pollinia, which are adapted to attach to particular pollinating agents such as birds or insects. More commonly, mature pollen grains separate and are dispensed by wind or water, pollinating insects, birds or other pollination vectors.

Pollen of angiosperms must be transported to the stigma, the receptive surface of the carpel, of a compatible flower, for successful pollination to occur. After arriving, the pollen grain (an immature microgametophyte) typically completes its development. It may grow a pollen tube and undergoing mitosis to produce two sperm nuclei.

Sexual reproduction in plants 

In the typical flower (that is, in the majority of flowering plant species) each flower has both carpels and stamens. In some species, however, the flowers are unisexual with only carpels or stamens. (monoecious = both types of flowers found on the same plant; dioecious = the two types of flower found only on different plants). A flower with only stamens is called androecious. A flower with only carpels is called gynoecious.

A flower having only functional stamens and lacking functional carpels is called a staminate flower, or (inaccurately) male.  A plant with only functional carpels is called pistillate, or (inaccurately) female.

An abortive or rudimentary stamen is called a staminodium or staminode, such as in Scrophularia nodosa.

The carpels and stamens of orchids are fused into a column. The top part of the column is formed by the anther, which is covered by an anther cap.

Terminology 
Stamen 
Stamens can also be adnate (fused or joined from more than one whorl):
 epipetalous: adnate to the corolla
 epiphyllous: adnate to undifferentiated tepals (as in many Liliaceae)
They can have different lengths from each other:
 didymous: two equal pairs
 didynamous: occurring in two pairs, a long pair and a shorter pair
 tetradynamous: occurring as a set of six stamens with four long and two shorter ones
or respective to the rest of the flower (perianth):
 exserted: extending beyond the corolla
 included: not extending beyond the corolla
They may be arranged in one of two different patterns:
 spiral; or
 whorled: one or more discrete whorls (series) 
They may be arranged, with respect to the petals:
 diplostemonous: in two whorls, the outer alternating with the petals, while the inner is opposite the petals.
 haplostemenous: having a single series of stamens, equal in number to the proper number of petals and alternating with them
 obdiplostemonous: in two whorls, with twice the number of stamens as petals, the outer opposite the petals, inner opposite the sepals, e.g. Simaroubaceae (see diagram)

Connective
Where the connective is very small, or imperceptible, the anther lobes are close together, and the connective is referred to as discrete, e.g. Euphorbia pp., Adhatoda zeylanica. Where the connective separates the anther lobes, it is called divaricate, e.g. Tilia, Justicia gendarussa. The connective may also be a long and stalk-like, crosswise on the filament, this is a distractile connective, e.g. Salvia. The connective may also bear appendages, and is called appendiculate, e.g. Nerium odorum and some other species of Apocynaceae. In Nerium, the appendages are united as a staminal corona.

Filament
A column formed from the fusion of multiple filaments is known as an androphore. Stamens can be connate (fused or joined in the same whorl) as follows:
 extrorse: anther dehiscence directed away from the centre of the flower. Cf. introrse, directed inwards, and latrorse towards the side.
 monadelphous: fused into a single, compound structure
 declinate: curving downwards, then up at the tip (also – declinate-descending)
 diadelphous: joined partially into two androecial structures
 pentadelphous: joined partially into five androecial structures
 synandrous: only the anthers are connate (such as in the Asteraceae). The fused stamens are referred to as a synandrium.

Anther
Anther shapes are variously described by terms such as linear, rounded, sagittate, sinuous, or reniform.

The anther can be attached to the filament's connective in two ways:
 basifixed: attached at its base to the filament
 pseudobasifixed: a somewhat misnomer configuration where connective tissue extends in a tube around the filament tip
 dorsifixed: attached at its center to the filament, usually versatile (able to move)

Gallery

References

Bibliography

External links

Plant anatomy
Plant morphology
Plant sexuality
Plant reproductive system
Pollination